Bartholomäus Kilian (1630–1696), was a German engraver and member of the Kilian family of engravers.

Biography
He was born in Augsburg as the son of Wolfgang Kilian and besides being a pupil of his father, he trained with the engravers Matthäus Merian the Younger in Frankfurt am Main, and François de Poilly in Paris. He was the younger brother of Philipp Kilian.

He died in Augsburg.

References

Sources
Bartholomäus Kilian on Artnet

External links
 

1630 births
1696 deaths
Kilian family